Jaakko Niemi (born 28 November 1961) is a Finnish biathlete. He competed in the men's sprint event at the 1992 Winter Olympics.

References

External links
 

1961 births
Living people
Finnish male biathletes
Olympic biathletes of Finland
Biathletes at the 1992 Winter Olympics
People from Valkeala
Sportspeople from Kymenlaakso